Colmán or Colman is both a given name and a surname. Notable people with the name include:

Medieval Irish people
 Colmán Bec (died c. 585), Irish dynast
 Colmán mac Cobthaig (died c. 622), Irish king
 Colmán mac Lénéni (died c. 606), Irish poet
 Colmán Már (died c. 557), Irish dynast
 Colmán Rímid (died c. 612), Irish king
 Colman nepos Cracavist (fl. c. 800), Hiberno-Latin poet

Saints
Colman of Templeshambo (d. 595), Abbot of Templeshambo
Colmán Elo (d. 611) of the moccu Béognae
Colman of Cloyne, 6th-century Bishop of Cloyne
Colman of Dromore, 6th-century Bishop of Dromore
Colman of Kilmacduagh, 7th-century Bishop of Kilmacduagh
Colmán of Kilroot, contemporary of St. Ailbe
Colmán of Lindisfarne (d. 676), bishop of Lindisfarne
Colmán of Lann, patron saint of Lann
St. Colman (martyr) (7th century), companion of St Kilian and St Totnan
Coloman of Stockerau (Colmán) (d. 1012), Irish pilgrim martyred in Austria
Columbanus (d. 615), Irish missionary

Given name
 Colman Domingo (born 1969), American actor, writer, director

Surname
 Andrew Colman (born 1944), British psychologist
 Chanan Colman (born 1984), Danish-Israeli professional basketball player for the Copenhagen Wolfpack of the Danish Basketligaen
 Daniel Colman (born 1990), American poker player
Eamon Colman (born 1957), Irish artist
 Eddie Colman (1936–1958), British footballer
 Edward Colman (cinematographer) (1905–1995), American cinematographer 
 Edward Colmans (1908–1977), American actor
 Ethel Colman (1863–1948), first woman to be Lord Mayor of Norwich and the first woman to be a Lord Mayor in England; daughter of Jeremiah Colman MP
 Fraser Colman (1925–2008), New Zealand politician
 Geoffrey Colman (1892–1935), first-class English cricketer; father of Timothy
 George Colman the Elder (1732–1794), English dramatist
 George Colman the Younger (1762–1836), English dramatist
 Jeremiah Colman (MP) (1830–1898), English businessman and Liberal politician; father of Ethel
 Sir Jeremiah Colman, 1st Baronet (1859–1942), English businessman and first of the Colman baronets
 Julia Colman (1828–1909), American temperance educator, activist, editor, writer
 Neville Colman (1945–2003), South African hematologist and forensic DNA expert
 Nicolás Colman, 16th-century English conquistador who served for the Spanish Crown 
 Olivia Colman (born 1974), British actress
 Robert Colman (d. 1428), English medieval Franciscan friar and university chancellor 
 Ronald Colman (1891–1958), English actor
 Samuel Colman (1832–1920), American interior designer
 Samuel Colman (British painter) (1780–1845)
 Sir Timothy Colman (1929–2021), British businessman and Lord Lieutenant of Norfolk
 Tony Colman (disambiguation)
 Tyler Colman, American wine critic known by the pen name Dr. Vino

Other
Colman's, a British mustard manufacturer
 Colman, South Dakota, city in Moody County, South Dakota, United States
Arthurstown, County Wexford, Ireland, a village
St Colman's College, Claremorris, County Mayo
St Colman's College, Newry, County Down
Colman, the sequel to the late Monica Furlong's Wise Child novel

See also
Colm (unrelated Irish name)
Kolman, a Slavic name sometimes transliterated as Colman
Coleman (surname)
Coloman, an ancient Germanic name
Kálmán, a Hungarian surname and given name

English masculine given names
Irish masculine given names